Richard Davis Johnstone (23 June 1936 – 18 November 2022) was a New Zealand track and road cyclist who participated in the 1964 Summer Olympic games, the 1958 and 1962 Commonwealth Games.

Johnstone went as an official to two Commonwealth Games, 1986 Edinburgh, Scotland and 1994 Victoria, Canada. He was elected as an official of the boycotted 1980 Moscow Olympic Games.

Johnstone was a New Zealand National Track cycling coach (1976–1994) and coached the winning team Tour of the Future (1992) in Arizona, United States. He was a New Zealand Cycling Selector.

Johnstone died in Auckland on 18 November 2022, at the age of 86.

References

External links
 

1936 births
2022 deaths
Cyclists at the 1964 Summer Olympics
Cyclists at the 1958 British Empire and Commonwealth Games
Cyclists at the 1962 British Empire and Commonwealth Games
New Zealand male cyclists
Olympic cyclists of New Zealand
Commonwealth Games competitors for New Zealand
Cyclists from Invercargill
20th-century New Zealand people